Pros and Cons is an American crime drama television series that ran on ABC from September 26, 1991, to January 2, 1992, in the United States during the 1991–92 television season. It is a revamped, more lighthearted version of Gabriel's Fire, which aired on ABC the previous season.

Overview
Gabriel Bird is a former Chicago police officer, who, over twenty years prior, had been wrongfully sentenced to life imprisonment for the murder of a fellow officer.  He was exonerated and subsequently became a Chicago private detective (as seen on Gabriel's Fire).  Bird then moves to Los Angeles, where he teams up with another private eye, Mitch O'Hannon. Bird also marries his love interest, Josephine, She had been the proprietress of a café where Bird had begun frequenting shortly after his release, at first for her good, homestyle cooking, but soon, primarily for her companionship.

The episode "Birds Gotta Fly", directed by Mario Van Peebles, starred Irene Cara as Bird's estranged daughter Celine, as well as movie and TV personality Michael Beach as Josephine's military-bound son, and Meagan Good in a small role.

When the revamped version of Gabriel's Fire was announced, its original working title was Bird & Katt, as Crenna's character was first named Peter Katt in development. After further revision of the new format, Peter Katt became Mitch O'Hannon and the producers settled on the title Pros and Cons, which had a dual meaning—not only that of the positives and negatives of the two leads working together, but of the fact that they were professional detectives often chasing after convicts.

Characters
Gabriel Bird, played by James Earl Jones
Josephine, played by Madge Sinclair
Mitch O'Hannon, played by Richard Crenna

External links
 

1990s American crime drama television series
Television series by Lorimar Television
American Broadcasting Company original programming
English-language television shows
1991 American television series debuts
1992 American television series endings